Lukáš Kubiš (born 31 January 2000) is a Slovak racing cyclist, who currently rides for UCI Continental team .

Major results

2017
 2nd Time trial, National Junior Road Championships
2018
 2nd Time trial, National Junior Road Championships
2019
 5th Overall Tour du Sénégal
2020
 1st  Road race, National Under-23 Road Championships
 2nd Overall Grand Prix Chantal Biya
1st  Points classification
1st Stage 3
 National Road Championships
3rd Road race
5th Time trial
 5th Overall Tour of Szeklerland
1st Young rider classification
2021
 National Under-23 Road Championships
1st  Time trial
2nd Road race
 1st  Overall Grand Prix Chantal Biya
1st  Points classification
1st  Young rider classification
1st Stages 2 & 4
 National Road Championships
2nd Time trial
3rd Road race
 4th GP Slovakia
 6th Overall Tour of Bulgaria
 9th Grand Prix Mediterrennean
2022
 National Under-23 Road Championships
1st  Road race
4th Time trial
 2nd Road race, National Road Championships
 2nd Overall Grand Prix Chantal Biya
 4th Visegrad 4 Kerékpárverseny
 5th Le Trophée de l'Anniversaire
 6th Grand Prix Oued Eddahab
 6th Le Trophée Princier
 9th Grand Prix Sakia El Hamra
 10th GP Slovakia
 10th Fyen Rundt
 10th Le Trophée de la Maison Royale

References

External links

2000 births
Living people
Slovak male cyclists
Place of birth missing (living people)
European Games competitors for Slovakia
Cyclists at the 2019 European Games
Cyclists at the 2018 Summer Youth Olympics
Olympic cyclists of Slovakia
Cyclists at the 2020 Summer Olympics
Sportspeople from Zvolen